Nogometni klub Šmartno ob Paki, commonly referred to as NK Šmartno ob Paki or simply Šmartno, was a Slovenian football club from Šmartno ob Paki. The club was dissolved in 2005 due to financial difficulties. Shortly afterwards, a new club under the name of Šmartno 1928 was formed. However, they are legally not considered as the successors to the dissolved club and the statistics and track records of the two clubs are kept separate by the Football Association of Slovenia.

History
Šmartno ob Paki spent three seasons in the Slovenian PrvaLiga, in which they earned 126 points in 96 matches. They finished in the fourth place during the 2002–03 season.

Honours
League

Slovenian Republic League
 Winners: 1980–81

Slovenian Second League
 Winners: 1994–95

Slovenian Third Division
 Winners: 1991–92

Cup
MNZ Celje Cup
 Winners: 1993, 1998–99, 2000–01

League history since 1991

References

External links
Footballzz profile

Association football clubs established in 1928
Defunct football clubs in Slovenia
Association football clubs disestablished in 2004
1928 establishments in Slovenia
2004 disestablishments in Slovenia